Lucinia cadma is a species of brush-footed butterfly (family Nymphalidae). It was first described by Dru Drury in 1773 from Jamaica. Distinct subspecies are found on other Caribbean islands.

Description
Upper side: antennae black. Head, thorax, and abdomen dark brown. Wings tawny yellow. The anterior having the extreme parts, near the tips, black; with two yellowish spots thereon, joining the anterior edges; also a round black spot situated at the lower corners on the posterior edges. Posterior wings immaculate, except a black streak placed on the anterior edges next the upper corners.

Under side: tongue black. Breast, legs, and abdomen ash-coloured. The superior wings marked and coloured as on the upper side, but less distinctly. Posterior wings tawny orange, having a broad ash-coloured bar crossing them from the anterior to the abdominal edges. On this bar are placed two eyes, with double pupils; the lower one being of a fine blue with a yellow iris; the upper one, next the anterior edges, blue and black, with a brown iris. Margins of the wings dentated.

Wing-span 2 inches (50 mm).

Subspecies
Lucinia cadma cadma (Jamaica)
Lucinia cadma albomaculata Rindge, 1955 (Bahamas)
Lucinia cadma sida Hübner, [1823] (Cuba)
Lucinia cadma torrebia (Ménétriés, 1832) (Haiti)

References

Biblidinae
Butterflies described in 1773
Descriptions from Illustrations of Exotic Entomology
Butterflies of the Caribbean
Taxa named by Dru Drury